Lul is a Shilluk village located on the western bank of the Nile river, approximately one and a half hours by boat north from the city of Malakal, in Upper Nile province in South Sudan. The Catholic Church established one of its first mission stations there in the early part of the 20th century, during the condominium period. The Catholic Church maintained a typical mission station there, including a school, health center and church. The station was abandoned by the Church in 1985 because of the second Sudanese civil war. With the end of the war, it is now being re-developed.

Populated places in Upper Nile (state)